Apurinã or Ipurina may refer to:
 Apurinã people: An indigenous South American people from western Brazil
 Apurinã language: Their Maipurean language